New York's 8th congressional district for the U.S. House of Representatives is in the New York City boroughs of Brooklyn and Queens. Its current representative is Hakeem Jeffries.

From 1993 to 2013, the district covered much of the west side of Manhattan and western coastal sections of Brooklyn. However, after decennial redistricting, it was redrawn to take in much of the territory previously in the 10th district. It now encompasses majority African-American and Caribbean-American Bedford-Stuyvesant, Brownsville, Canarsie, East New York, Ocean Hill, Spring Creek, and East Flatbush; the mostly white neighborhoods of Bergen Beach, Gerritsen Beach, Howard Beach, Marine Park, Mill Basin and Sea Gate; and mixed neighborhoods like Clinton Hill, Flatlands, Fort Greene, Ozone Park, Brighton Beach, and Coney Island. Most of the old 8th was renumbered as the 10th.

Voting

History
1913–1963:
Parts of Brooklyn
1963–1983:
Parts of Queens
1983–1993:
Parts of Bronx, Nassau, Queens
1993–2013:
Parts of Brooklyn, Manhattan
2013–2023:
Parts of Brooklyn, Queens
2023–present:
Parts of Brooklyn

Various New York districts have been numbered "8" over the years, including areas in New York City and various parts of upstate New York. The state's congressional districts had been redrawn in a manner that puts much of the territory of the old 10th Congressional district into the new 8th Congressional district. The election had a few competitors for what was then an open seat, with the 10th incumbent congressman Edolphus Towns retiring. State assemblyman Hakeem Jeffries faced off against New York City Councilman Charles Barron. Jeffries won the primary and ultimately the general election.

List of members representing the district

1793–1833: One seat

1833–1843: Two seats
From 1833 to 1843, two seats were apportioned to the District, elected at-large on a general ticket.

1843–present: One seat 

The 8th district was a Queens-based seat until the 1992 redistricting. At that time much of the old 8th district became the 5th district. The new 8th district was created by cobbling together portions of the Manhattan-based 17th district and the 13th district in Brooklyn.

Recent election results
In New York electoral politics there are numerous minor parties at various points on the political spectrum. Certain parties will invariably endorse either the Republican or Democratic candidate for every office, hence the state electoral results contain both the party votes, and the final candidate votes (Listed as "Recap").

Historical district boundaries

See also

List of United States congressional districts
New York's congressional districts
United States congressional delegations from New York

Notes

References

 Congressional Biographical Directory of the United States 1774–present
 Election date from the Clerk of the United States House of Representatives
 1996 House election data
 1998 House election data
 2000 House election data
 2002 House election data
 2004 House election data

08
Constituencies established in 1793
1793 establishments in New York (state)